Bilasipara is a town, sub-division and town area committee in Dhubri district  in the state of Assam, India.

About 

This town is under Bilasipara Municipal Board (BMB) and is part of two MLA constituency namely 27 Bilasipara East 26 Bilasipara West. It has a population of approximately fifty thousand  (excluding the Bilasipara sub-division). The widely spoken language of the town is 'Ujani'; the locals call it 'Desi'. People of many religions, castes and mother-tongues are found here.

The official population of the town in 2015 is more than 50,000. The MLA of 27 Bilasipara East constituency is Samsul Huda (AIUDF) and the MLA of 26 Bilasipara West is Hafiz Bashir Ahmed (AIUDF)

Geography
It has an average elevation of 26 metres (85 feet).

The outer parts of the town suffer from flooding almost yearly; it poses a major problem.

Resources
A large number of people residing near the town in the sub-divisional areas are involved in farming and food production. Products available in the market are mostly from the nearby villages and the surrounding area. Paddy fields line either side of the highway. The fields produce mustard seeds in their season. Food and paddy products are exported to other towns, cities and states. A river known as Gaurang, which is a tributary of the Brahmaputra, enters the town from the east. It is the only water source other than small lakes and ponds.

Education 

This town is well known for its educational institutions. There are many English medium and Assamese medium schools in the town, and Hindi and Bengali medium schools and colleges.

Colleges
 Bilasipara College,  (Established in 1960)
 B.M. Jr. College, Bilasipara (Established in 1991)
 Rokakhata Higher Secondary School
 N.H. Memorial Academy
 Bilasipara Science Academy (An initiative of Sharif Ahmed and his friends started in 2015 )
 Bilasipara Public H.S. School

Schools
 Bilasipara Public H.S. School
 Super 40 gems academy
 I.N. Academy H.S. School
SPM Academy Krishanagar
 Rokakhata H.S. School
 Konmoina Jatiya Bidyalaya
 The Phoenix Academy
 Kids Garden English medium School
 K.M.Little Flower English Medium High School
 Shankardev Shishu Aru Vidya Niketan
 Hakama Girls' High School
 Town Girls High School
 Milijuli jatiyavidyalaya khudigaon 
 327 No. Dwarakanath L.P. School
 Eden Valley School
 1631 No. Sri Sri Durga Pathshala
 B.C.F. Academy, Surjya Khata
 J.A. Adarsha Jatiya Vidyalaya, Surjya Khata
 Bangalipara MEM School
 Surjya Khata L.P. School
 Al-Amin Academy 
 2048 No. Saheed Smriti Vidya Niketan
 Dr. A.P.J. Abdul Kalam Academy
 Sun Rise Academy
 Sunflower English Medium High School
 Greenland Public School, Surjyakhata
 Azad Jatiya Bidyalaya, Anandnagar

Health and medical services
The town has one civil hospital, one SHC hospital and a few private clinics.

Music, arts and literature 
Traditionally, Goalparia music is the main form of traditional music here.

Transport and communication 
The town is well connected by Bus routes especially with north Bengal, North of Assam and Upper Assam as well, on 25 March 2019 Bilasipara connected with Rail routes too. , 3-wheeler and 4 wheeler passenger carriers, rickshaws and tuk-tuks are available.

References
2.latest Photographs of Bilasipara
Cities and towns in Dhubri district
Dhubri